Cecil Bendall (1 July 1856 – 14 March 1906) was an English scholar, a professor of Sanskrit at University College London and later at the University of Cambridge.

Bendall was educated at the City of London School and at the University of Cambridge, achieving first-class honours in the Classical Tripos in 1879 and the Indian Languages Tripos in 1881. He was elected to a fellowship at Gonville and Caius College.

From 1882 to 1893 he worked at the British Museum in the department of Oriental Manuscripts (now part of the British Library).

In 1894–1895 he was in Nepal and Northern India collecting oriental manuscripts for British Museum. During the winter 1898–1899 he returned to Nepal and together with pandit Hara Prasad Shastri and his assistant pandit Binodavihari Bhattacharya from the Asiatic Society in Calcutta, the team registered and collected information from palm-leaf manuscripts in the Durbar Library belonging to Rana Prime Minister Bir Shumsher J. B. Rana, and here he found the famous historical document Gopal Raj Vamshavali, describing Nepal's history from around 1000 to 1600.

He was Professor of Sanskrit at University College London from 1895 to 1902, and at Cambridge from 1903 until his death.

He was a contributor to the Dictionary of National Biography.

He died in Liverpool in 1906 and is buried at the Parish of the Ascension Burial Ground in Cambridge.

References
 W. B. Owen, "Bendall, Cecil (1856–1906)", rev. R. S. Simpson, Oxford Dictionary of National Biography, Oxford University Press, 2004 accessed 11 March 2013
 "BENDALL, Cecil", Who Was Who, A & C Black, an imprint of Bloomsbury Publishing plc, 1920–2008; online ed., Oxford University Press, Dec 2007 accessed 11 March 2013
 
 
 Cecil Bendall: A Journey of Literary and Archaeological Research in Nepal and Northern India during the winter 1884–5, Cambridge University Press, 1886 - 154 sider
 Hara Prasad Shastri. A Catalogue of Palm-Leaf and selected Paper Manuscripts belonging to the Durbar Library, Nepal, Calcutta 1905—with historical introduction by Cecil Bendall (including a description of Gopal Raj Vamshavali)

External links 
 

1856 births
1906 deaths
Academics of University College London
British Sanskrit scholars
Employees of the British Library
Fellows of Gonville and Caius College, Cambridge
Linguists from the United Kingdom